Eucalyptus mackintii, commonly known as the blue-crowned stringybark, is a species of medium-sized tree that is endemic to Victoria. It has rough, stringy bark on the trunk and branches, lance-shaped to curved adult leaves, flowers buds in groups of between seven and eleven, white flowers and cup-shaped or hemispherical fruit.

Description
It has rough, stringy, greyish or brownish bark from the trunk to the smallest branches. Flowering occurs in June and the flowers are white.

Taxonomy and naming
Eucalyptus mackintii was first formally described in 1990 by Michael Kottek in Australian Systematic Botany. The specific epithet (mackintii) honours the forester James Andrew McKinty who first recognised this species as distinct.

Distribution and habitat
The blue-crowned stringybark grows mainly in the foothills of a restricted area near Lakes Entrance and to the north and east of Orbost.

See also
List of Eucalyptus species

References

Trees of Australia
mackintii
Myrtales of Australia
Plants described in 1990
Flora of Victoria (Australia)